George Dalaras (Γιώργος Νταλάρας, 29 September 1949) is a Greek musician and singer. He is one of the most prominent figures of Greek musical culture. In October 2006, he was selected as a Goodwill Ambassador for the UN Refugee Agency. 

He was born in Piraeus. His first memories of music were the basic forms of Greek music, such as traditional, folk, rebetiko, laïka, which influenced him as an artist. In addition, he has performed many other music genres in several different languages, such as pop, rock, latin, contemporary, byzantine music, classical, opera etc. He has collaborated with many Greek and foreign artists (composers, poets, maestros, musicians, etc). In all, he has released almost 90 personal albums and has collaborated in more than 140 others as musician, singer or producer. He is the Greek artist who has performed the biggest concerts of all time, both in Greece and abroad. He has performed at some of the most famous concert halls and stadiums all over the world, and has collaborated with many of the most renowned symphonic orchestras of the world. He has received several honors and awards, including the "Kennedy" Award and the UNESCO Goodwill Ambassadorship.

Early career
Dalaras' first song, "Προσμονή" (Prosmoni, "expectation"), was recorded in 1967. The single never reached any popular status, in fact it was barely released. Dalaras even had to struggle to get into the studio, as ironically the day he began his studio career was the day that the Greek military junta took over the streets of Athens, and the roads were littered with tanks. After several appearances on various recordings as a guest singer, his debut album was released in early 1969, a self-titled album released on the Minos label. The recording included many compositions by Stavros Kouyioumtzis, who in the early years proved a fountain of help towards Dalaras achieving musical success. As Dalaras has said in various interviews, he owes the fact that he became a singer to Kouyioumtzis, who composed Dalaras' first songs. His relation with Kouyioumtzis remained friendly until the sudden death of the composer due to a heart attack in March 2005.

The biggest hit of the record, "Που 'ναι τα χρόνια" (Pou 'ne ta chronia, "Where are the years?"), is still sung today, and is regarded as a mainstay in Dalaras' large repertoire. In 1970, he released the album "Να 'τανε το 21 " (Na 'tane to ikosi-ena, "If only it were '21", that is, 1821, a reference to the Greek War of Independence). The album was immediately more successful than his debut LP and included hits such as "Na 'tane to 21'", "Κάπου νυχτώνει" ("Kapou nichtoni", Somewhere the night falls), and an instrumental version of "Pou 'ne ta chronia". The album was made up entirely of compositions by Stavros Kouyioumtzis. The songs were mainly reinterpretations, as was common in the late 60s for new Greek singers; however, not all the songs on their first release (most of them on the smaller yet more distinctive LYRA label) had proved successful, and in many instances, even now, many people in Greece believe that the Dalaras songs are originals and not cover versions.

First gold album
In 1972, Dalaras, along with singer Haris Alexiou, received his big break in the Greek music industry when their LP "Μικρά Ασία" (Mikra Asia, Asia Minor) went gold, his first album to do so. The songs were written by Apostolos Kaldaras, a heavyweight in the laïkó scene of the 50s and 60s, who at this time decided to enter the political fray of Greek music. Dalaras and Alexiou were immediately thrown into the limelight. The LP was also recently re-released in both CD and limited edition LP format by Minos-EMI. The Mikra Asia LP was followed up by "Βυζαντινός Εσπερινός" (Vizantinos Esperinos, Byzantine Vespers) in 1973. The album consisted again of Dalaras and Haris Alexiou, and was composed by Apostolos Kaldaras, however the lyrics were by the emerging Lefteris Papadopoulos, who had written Dalaras' first official recording. This was the last time that Dalaras officially worked with Apostolos Kaldaras in the studio, however, they worked together in live performances. Unlike Mikra Asia, Vizantinos Esperinos did not meet with exceptional sales, and is somewhat 'forgotten' in the repertoire of Dalaras's songs.

Rebetiko revival
After several LPs and further collaborations with Kouyioumtzis, Kaldaras, Manos Loïzos, Mikis Theodorakis and others, Dalaras decided to release his own renditions of rebetiko songs on the double LP "50 Χρόνια Ρεμπέτικο Τραγούδι" (Peninta Chronia Rebetiko Tragoudi, 50 Years of Rebetiko songs), released 1975. The recording proved an immediate success, despite the toning down of the lyrics. However, as a result, a new movement was set to take place in Greek music, and the once forgotten rebetes were finding themselves performing, in some cases for the first time in 30 to 40 years. He followed up this work with an LP in 1980, "Ρεμπέτικα της Κατοχής" (Rebetika tis Katohis,  Rebetiko (songs) of the occupation), which was a more gritty and meaty release, more faithful to the tone of the original rebetika as heard in the 1930s. However, again references to drugs were cut out, and only mentioned in passing. Unlike the previous double LP, this one contained some of the original musicians, Bayianteras and Genitsaris in particular making an appearance on the album.

Collaborations and styles
Since the 1960s, Dalaras has recorded more than 120 records. He has sung numerous different Greek music styles (e.g. rebetiko, laïkó, Latin, pop), Israeli and Arabic music, and religious music. He has collaborated with many contemporary Greek composers, including Mikis Theodorakis, Stavros Kouyioumtzis, Manos Loizos, Apostolos Kaldaras, Stavros Xarhakos, Manos Hadjidakis and Christos Nikolopoulos. He also discovered and supported young Areti Ketime, producing her first album. Apart from his prominent singing career, Dalaras is considered to be one a talented musician as he plays most of the stringed instruments of a Greek folk band with great success, including the guitar, bouzouki, baglamas, tzouras and outi. He has accompanied Al Di Meola and Paco de Lucía, among others.  Dalaras' most important projects include collaborations with several international singers, including British singer Sting, releasing together a duet of Sting's song Mad About You. He has also collaborated with Pyx Lax, Bruce Springsteen, Jethro Tull, Yehuda Poliker, Emma Shapplin, Goran Bregovic, Apostolis Anthimos, Dulce Pontes, Andriana Babali and many others. Dalaras moved from his homestay label of Minos EMI in favour of Universal Music Greece in 2006, thus ending an almost 40 year collaboration.

In 2000, Dalaras discovered a new local orchestra that specialized at traditional Smirneiko (from Smyrna) and Rebetiko songs. The orchestra's name was "Εστουδιαντίνα Νέας Ιωνίας" (Estoudiantina Neas Ionias and it came from Nea Ionia, a city near Volos. Dalaras pulled Estoudiantina in the light of publicity and make it known to the Greek public. Since then Estoudiantina has become one of the most important and famous orchestras in Greece. Estoudiantina's repertoire now also includes Modern Greek, Greek Laiko, and Mediterranean.

The big orchestras
Dalaras is a Greek traveler, an exceptional interpreter, a restless musician who deeply believes in the individual character of Greek music, in its power and its competence and, at the same time, in its global quality. His relentless pursuits journeyed Greece to the end of the world while, his conviction that the multinational model is based on the mutual possession of the artistic heritage has fused his interpretation abilities with the dexterity of a number of the most renowned orchestras of the world.
The famous Dutch Metropole Orchestra is the first big orchestra with which George Dalaras collaborated. It was an exciting artistic gathering which took place in 1995, in the Odeon of Herodes Atticus, under the direction of Dick Baker. It consisted of two musical performances which moved and captivated the public through a song list which was dedicated to the soundtracks and the songs by Mikis Theodorakis the performances were recorded live and, consequently, released by EMI CLASSICS in fifteen countries, in an album titled "GEORGE DALARAS & METROPOLE ORCHESTRA".
The artist’s next collaboration with one of the most prominent and long-existent choirs in Europe took part when, in 1996, he interpreted Ariel Ramirez Misa Criolla Mass accompanied by the choir of the Deutsche Oper Berlin in the Berlin Opera. It was a much anticipated concert since, the tickets had long been sold out and, so much the daily press as well as the opera leaflets had extensively referred to the event. The fact that, the concert was transmitted live by SFB –a radio station with a predominantly classical repertoire- is worth mentioning.
The next event was to be with the Israel Philharmonic Orchestra, one of the most outstanding orchestras worldwide. In 1997, the Orchestra invited George Dalaras to stage two concerts in the Tel Aviv Mann Auditorium. The orchestra was conducted by Ilias Voudouris. It was a collaboration which materialized, in the best possible way, George Dalaras’ long desire to interpret a number of the most brilliant Greek songs accompanied by a symphony orchestra. The internationally acknowledged interpretation skills of the Philharmonic Orchestra came together with the powerful and charismatic stage presence, the promptness and, lastly, the soulful interpretation of George Dalaras in an unfolding of the portrait of contemporary Greek music. A musical journey which began from the rebetiko songs to cross over to his big hits, to all-time classics by prominent Greek composers, to melodies from the Mediterranean as well as to medieval songs by the Greek Jewish Sephardi population (in Ladino) The live recordings of these performances were internationally released in April 1999 by EMI CLASSICS in a digital disc titled: "GEORGE DALARAS AND THE ISRAEL PHILHARMONIC ORCHESTRA", a release which made quite a stir.
In parallel, George Dalaras has collaborated with the Camerata - Friends of Music Orchestra in 1994, on the stage of the Athens Concert Hall in both the "...and by light and by death incessantly" and the "Angel Hymns in Human Rhythms" musical performances by Stavros Kougioumtzis under the direction of Alexandros Myrat.
In 1999, George Dalaras collaborated with the Osipov State Russian Folk Orchestra. It was a high standard collaboration which made an impression by means of its simplicity and its musicality. Thousands of spectators went for a standing ovation following George Dalaras’ interpretation of songs by Greek composers as well as of ballads from the Mediterranean. These versions were magnificently executed by the Ossipov Orchestra which is one of the most famous and grand orchestras worldwide since, it manages to merge the symphonic structure with the pop and folk elements. The 70-membered orchestra -which consisted of players of balalaikas and domras- was conducted by Nikolai Kalinin. The performances were staged in the Athens Concert Hall, in Salonica, in the Patras Ancient Conservatory, in Cyprus, in London’s Queen Elizabeth Hall and, finally, in Moscow, in November 2000.
In October 1999, George Dalaras met in the famous Notre-Dame Basilica, which is situated in the old city of Montreal, with the Montreal Symphony Orchestra which was conducted by Charles Dutoit, the famous conductor. The Montreal Symphony Orchestra, which consists of distinguished soloists, was founded in 1934 and is, today, one of the biggest orchestras in the world.
In September 2000, George Dalaras collaborated, for the first time, with them BBC Concert Orchestra, one of the most outstanding British orchestras. They met at the packed theatre Odeon of Herodes Atticus in a recital of superb orchestrations for a grand orchestra under the direction of Nick Davies and the participation of Joan Faulkner, the famous American jazz singer. The concert, the tickets of which had been sold out days before, was repeated in October of the same year in London’s Royal Festival Hall with the participation of the big School. *In October 2000, four concerts that were staged in Cyprus signaled George Dalaras’ collaboration with the famous Kremlin Moscow State Symphony Orchestra. This was an event in which Margarita Zorbala, the exquisite performer, had also taken part. The Kremlin Symphony Orchestra consists of 70 superb soloists while, its main characteristic is the coalescence of the instrumental harmony structure with an impeccable technique and artistic expression. Pavel Ovsianikov is the artistic director and conductor of the orchestra; he is a composer who, in the course of his creative career, has managed to combine the preservation of the rich Russian cultural heritage with the quest for new musical ideas. In November 2000, they, once more, met in Russia, in a concert that was staged in Grand Kremlin Palace’s George Hall.
In June 2001, George Dalaras collaborated again with the Osipov State Russian Folk Orchestra conducted by Nikolai Kalinin. The event took place in Delphi and it was a unique concert that was part of the list of events scheduled for the celebration of the First World Refugee Day as well as for the completion of 50 years upon the founding of the United Nations High Commissioner for Refugees. The song list of the concert in which Jocelyn B. Smith, the prominent American singer had also taken part, included, mainly, songs by Mikis Theodorakis to whom the concert was dedicated as being one of the most renowned refugees globally.
In August 2001, George Dalaras –through his participation in the Saratoga Classical Music Festival- collaborated for the first time with the famous Philadelphia Orchestra conducted by Charles Dutoit, the renowned maestro with whom they had met two years before in the Montreal Notre Dame Basilica Cathedral. The above Festival is one of the most celebrated Classical Music Festivals around the world which, each summer, is organized in Saratoga Springs, N.Y. It was the first time that a Greek artist participated in it.
Towards the end of 2002 and the beginning of 2003, George Dalaras collaborated with the Cyprus Symphony Orchestra. Together, they staged three concerts in London, Copenhagen and Paris which aimed at promoting the cultural visage of Europe, upon the instance Cyprus’ imminent integration within the European Union.
In August 2004, George Dalaras performed two concerts entitled "30th – 40th parallel – Musical Journey to the Mediterranean" at the Odeon of Herodes Atticus, with special guests Dulce Pontes, Stefanos Korkolis, Eddy Napoli, Mira Awad, Macarena Giraldez Losada, Marcos Jimenez Antonio and Compania Flamenca "Ronda Al Alba", Halil Moustafa and Mehmet Moustafa. The artists were accompanied by a popular orchestra and ERT National Symphonic Orchestra, conducted by Loukas Karitinos. In May 2005 George Dalaras and Dulce Pontes performed two unique concerts at the Herodes Atticus Odeon entitled "The Sea and Us". These concerts were organized by the Association of Friends of Children with Cancer "ELPIDA" for supporting their objectives, under the auspices of the Hellenic Festival.
In November 2005, George Dalaras performed at the Athens Concert Hall two of the most significant works of Mikis Theodorakis "Romiosini" poetry by Yiannis Ritsos and "Axion Esti" poetry by Odysseas Elytis. In these concerts texts of the poets were read by George Kimoulis. In "Axion Esti" Tassis Christoyannis, baritone also participated. George Dalaras was accompanied by the Popular Orchestra "Mikis Theodarakis" and a popular orchestra, the Greek Radio and TV Modern Music Orchestra conducted by Andreas Pylarinos, the Electricity Board Choir with Choirmaster Kostis Konstantaras, the Athens Municipal Choir with Choirmaster Stavros Beris and the Youth Choir of the Nea Smyrni Leontion Lyceum with Choirmaster Katerina Vasilikou. The proceeds of both concerts were offered to the Association of Rehabilitation for Addicted persons "THE RETURN". Among the rest of its leads, the Orchestra wrote history in cinema when, in 1939, it recorded the soundtrack of Walt Disney’s Fantasia –a peak cartoon character movie which facilitated the popularization of symphony music in the United States.
In November 2010, George Dalaras had a unique concert in New York at Lincoln Center with CityMusic Cleveland conducted by Alexandros Myrat. The works of the Greek-Canadian composer Christos Hadzis "Credo" and "Telluric Dances" were presented for the first time in a world premiere.
In June and September 2011, George Dalaras cooperated with the Osipov State Russian Folk Orchestra conducted by Vladimir Andropov, in very successful concerts in Cyprus and Israel. He was accompanied by Aspasia Stratigou.
In July 2011 George Dalaras cooperated for the first time with the Istanbul State Symphony Orchestra conducted by Hakan Sensoy, in a unique sold out concert, accompanied by Aspasia Stratigou.
On 26 November 2011, George Dalaras presented in a world premier the work "Kavafis" by the composer Alexandros Karozas at the Konzerthaus, Vienna with Vienna Chamber Orchestra and Wiener Singakademie, under the direction of the maestro Yorgos Kountouris. One of the most important German actors, Bruno Ganz recited the poems of Constantine P. Cavafy.
In September 2012, George Dalaras participated in "Balkan Symphony" in Sarajevo. In this concert prominent artists from Balkan countries and the Mediterranean participated together with the Sarajevo Philharmonic Orchestra, enriched with local instruments, conducted by Oguzhan Balci.
In February 2013, George Dalaras presented the work "Kavafis" by the composer Alexandros Karozas, at Gasteig in Munich with Vienna Chamber Orchestra and Wiener Singakademie of the "Vienna Academy of Music" under the direction of Stefan Vladar. One of the leading German character actors, Lambert Hamel recited the poems of Konstantine Kavafis.

Concerts and sales

In his almost 50-year musical career, Dalaras has performed in thousands of concerts, and in 1980, entered the era of the live Greek club. Two historical concerts occurred in the Athens Olympic Stadium, attended by more than 160,000 people. This was the largest attendance at a Greek concert, to the point where Rolling Stone magazine commented that Dalaras was responsible for the birth of the Stadium era in Greece.

Dalaras personal albums total beyond 70. He has sold more than 15,000,000 records in his career and is regarded as one of the biggest names in contemporary Greek music. He has toured extensively throughout the world and was even invited to sing for Nelson Mandela on his birthday.

His live albums, including tributes to Vassilis Tsitsanis and Markos Vamvakaris, all reached multi platinum sales, and resulted in being among the top 10 releases of 2005. In December 2005, he released a live recording called "Μεσόγειος 30ος 40ος Παράλληλος" (Mediterranean 30th 40th parallel) with various renditions of Greek, Italian, Israeli and Arabic songs, and famous musicians from Hebrew and Arabic backgrounds, which gained multi platinum status.

International Orthodox Youth Conference controversy
Dalaras had been scheduled to perform a concert on the closing night of the second International Orthodox Youth Conference held in Istanbul from 11 to 15 July 2007. The event, organised by the Ecumenical Patriarchate of Constantinople, had drawn the ire of the Turkish press and Turkish nationalist politicians who filed complaints to the Governorship of Istanbul to revoke the licence for the concert it had issued, and the concert was abruptly cancelled by the Turkish authorities of the Governorship of Istanbul on the grounds that the country's Archaeological Service did not permit the use of the planned venue, the 15th century Rumeli Hisar castle. The site had previously been used for international theatre festivals and for an international dance festival, until its use was prohibited by the Archaeological Service. The last-minute cancellation of the concert attracted strong media coverage and criticism in neighbouring Greece.

Personal life
Dalaras was born George Daralas, son of the rembetiko singer Loukas Daralas. He subsequently anagrammatized his name to Dalaras. Since 1983, Dalaras is married to Anna Ragousi, also his manager and former politician who served with the PASOK government in 2009 and 2011. They have one daughter, Georgianna. Dalaras is a collector of musical instruments and in his spare time he goes fishing and traveling on his motorcycle, being a big motorsports fan.

Selected discography
1969 Giorgos Ntalaras
1970 Natane To 21
1971 O Metoikos
1971 Ta Tragoudia Tou Apostolou Kaldara
1972 Mikra Asia
1972 Naxame,Ti naxame
1973 Byzantinos Esperinos
Latin
:el:100 Χρόνια Σινεμά
:el:Βυζαντινός Εσπερινός
:el:Γιώργος Νταλάρας (δίσκος)
:el:Ηλιοσκόπιο
:el:Καλώς τους!
:el:Τραγούδια με ουσίες

References

External links
Official website
An unofficial website

Ogdoo
ERT Archive

1949 births
Living people
Musicians from Piraeus
Greek classical guitarists
20th-century Greek male singers
Greek entehno singers
Greek laïko singers
Greek rebetiko singers
United Nations High Commissioner for Refugees Goodwill Ambassadors
Minos EMI artists
Universal Music Greece artists
21st-century Greek male singers